"Ay Ay Ay Ay Moosey" is a single by UK band Modern Romance. It was their second UK chart entry in 1981, reaching No. 10. It was released as a 7-inch single and 12-inch single by WEA. It was also released in Germany, Japan and the Netherlands and was produced by David Jaymes Geoff Deane, and Norman Mighell.

Formats
7-inch single
Ay Ay Ay Ay Moosey
Tear the Roof Off the Moose
12-inch single
Ay Ay Ay Ay Moosey
Moose on the Loose [Disco Mix]
Tear the Roof Off the Moose [Dub Discomix]
7-inch single (Germany)
Ay Ay Ay Ay Moosey
Moose on the Loose
12-inch single (Germany)
Ay Ay Ay Ay Moosey
Everybody Salsa
7-inch single (Japan)
Ay Ay Ay Ay Moosey
Everybody Salsa
7-inch single (Netherlands)
Ay Ay Ay Ay Moosey
Moose on the Loose

History
"Ay Ay Ay Ay Moosey" was originally a UK hit for Modern Romance in 1981 and was included on their debut album, Adventures in Clubland (1981) as part of the Clubland Mix along with "Everybody Salsa", "Salsa Rappsody", and "Moose on the Loose". It was the single that introduced Modern Romance's new drummer, Andy Kyriacou. The single also made its way onto the compilation albums Party Tonight (1983) and Modern Romance: The Platinum Collection (2006). It was also a part of their farewell single, "Best Mix of Our Lives" (1985), an anthology single of the band's biggest hits.
The lyrics were written by Deane in order to settle a £10 bet with a Turkish taxi driver, named Moosey, that he couldn't write a hit record with his name in the title ,

In 2005 the track was rerecorded with new lyrics as 'I I I Love Barnet' to celebrate Barnet FC's promotion to the Football League.

Chart position
UK Chart #10

Personnel
Geoff Deane - vocals
David Jaymes - bass guitar
Robbie Jaymes - synthesizer
Paul Gendler - guitar
Andy Kyriacou - drums
David Jaymes, Geoff Deane, Norman Mighell - Producer (music)

References

External links
Modern Romance - IMDB - Internet Movie Database - https://www.imdb.com/name/nm2167905/J
John Du Prez - IMDB - https://www.imdb.com/name/nm0006047/
David Jaymes - IMDB - https://www.imdb.com/name/nm1659850/
Paul Gendler - IMDB - https://www.imdb.com/name/nm0312678/
Modern Romance - Discogs Website - http://www.discogs.com/artist/Modern+Romance
Modern Romance - Chart Stats Website - https://www.officialcharts.com/artists/

1981 singles
Modern Romance (band) songs
Songs written by Geoff Deane
1981 songs
Warner Music Group singles
Songs written by David Jaymes